Allen Wood (13 January 1941 – 30 March 2018) is a Welsh former professional footballer. A central defender, he played for Lovell's Athletic, Bristol Rovers, Merthyr Tydfil and Newport County.

References

1941 births
2018 deaths
Welsh footballers
Lovell's Athletic F.C. players
Bristol Rovers F.C. players
Merthyr Tydfil F.C. players
Newport County A.F.C. players
English Football League players
Association football defenders
Wales amateur international footballers
Welsh football managers